Wet'n'Wild Hawaii (formerly Hawaiian Waters Adventure Park) is a Hawaiian water park, located in Kapolei in the City and County of Honolulu on Oahu. The park occupies  of land and has more than 25 rides and attractions. It is currently the only water park in the state of Hawaii. It is one of six water parks operating under the Wet'n'Wild brand globally.

Wet'n'Wild Hawaii was defined in the Makakilo City CDP in the 2000 U.S. Census but for the 2010 U.S. Census was redefined as being in Kapolei CDP.

History
On October 6, 1998, construction began for the  Hawaiian Waters Adventure Park. The water park was the first venture by limited liability company, Waters of Kapolei. Owned by dentist Jack Harrington and lawyer Brooks Cutter, Waters of Kapolei, LLC invested $14 million in the park. The park officially opened on May 28, 1999. In the park's first month of operation, it experienced 20% higher-than-expected attendance, resulting in a total of 440,000 visitors in its first year of operation. This saw the park add a new attraction just one year after opening.

In May 2007, Wet'n'Wild Hawaii opened Island Adventure Golf, an 18-hole high-end miniature golf facility. The miniature golf course features lush tropical landscape, nine ADA-compliant holes, a putting green, surfboard hazards, water ways, waterfall, large ocean and beach area, mock fish and sea turtles, lava rock formations and coral reef displays.

In March 2008, an agreement was announced in which the park would be sold to Village Roadshow Limited, making Wet'n'Wild Hawaii the Australian company's first theme park in the United States. The $27 million deal closed in May that year. In early 2009, the company announced the park would open under its new name, Wet'n'Wild Hawaii.

Village Roadshow's ownership of the park was short-lived. The park was sold to CNL Lifestyle Properties for an undisclosed sum in 2009. Village Roadshow Theme Parks, however, continued to operate the park on a lease which concluded in November 2013. Premier Parks, LLC took over operations for the 2014 season.

Rides

Below is a list of rides at the water park.
Big Kahuna
(Cutter's Island) Closed
Da FlowRider
Hawaiian Waters Wave Pool
(Island Adventure Golf) Closed
Kapolei Kooler Lazy River
Keiki Kove
Lil'Kahuna Beach
O-Hana Highway
Shaka
Surfsliders
Tornado
Volcano Express
Waianae Coasters
Waimea Whirl
'(Water World) Closed March 2022'

See also
 Wet'n'Wild Phoenix
 Wet'n'Wild Palm Springs
 Wet'n'Wild Las Vegas
 Wet'n'Wild Gold Coast
 Wet'n'Wild Sydney

References

External links
Official website
Da FlowRider 
Island Adventure Golf  

Water parks in Hawaii
1999 establishments in Hawaii